The Mariscal Nieto Province (Spanish mariscal marshal)  is the largest of three provinces that make up the Moquegua Region of Peru. The capital of the province is the city of Moquegua.

Boundaries
North: General Sánchez Cerro Province
East: Tacna Region
South: Ilo Province
West: Arequipa Region

Geography 
Some of the highest mountains of the province are listed below:

Political division
The province is divided into six districts, which are:

Ethnic groups 
The province is inhabited by indigenous citizens of Aymara and Quechua descent. Spanish, however, is the language which the majority of the population (79.51%) learnt to speak in childhood, 15.65% of the residents started speaking using the Aymara language and  4.45% using Quechua (2007 Peru Census).

See also 
 Administrative divisions of Peru

References

External links
 Official web site of the Municipalidad Provincial Mariscal Nieto

Provinces of the Moquegua Region